Armi Dallera Custom (ADC) is a firearms manufacturer and custom builder based in Concesio, Italy. Roberto Dallera started his professional career as a gunsmith in 1987, and when he founded ADC in 1990 he became the first European custom pistol manufacturer. For long the company focused on custom firearms and professional gunsmithing, but in the later years ADC has also started producing their own parts and complete firearms.

References

External links 
The official Facebook page of ADC
The official YouTube-channel of ADC

Firearm manufacturers of Italy
Companies based in Lombardy
Province of Brescia
Manufacturing companies established in 1990
Italian companies established in 1990
Privately held companies of Italy